Defossé, Defosse is a French surname. Notable people with the surname include:

Adolphe-Édouard Défossé (1855–1922), French politician
Alain Defossé (1957–2017), French novelist and translator
Robert Défossé (1909–1973), French football player
Denis Marion born Defosse

French-language surnames